A personal  web server (PWS) is system of hardware and software that is designed to create and manage a web server on a desktop computer. It can be used to learn how to set up and administer a website, and it can also serve as a site for testing dynamic web pages. One of the main functions of PWS is to provide an environment where web programmers can test their programs and web pages. Therefore, a PWS supports the more common server-side programming approaches that can be used with production web servers.

A personal web server, or personal server in short, allows users to store, selectively share, or publish information on the web or on a home network. Unlike other types of web servers, a personal web server is owned or controlled by an individual, and operated for the individual's needs, instead of by a company. It can be implemented in different ways:
 as a computer appliance
 as a general-purpose server, such as a Linux server, which may be located at the owner's home or in a data center
 in a shared hosting model, where several users share one physical server by means of virtualization, or virtual hosting.
 as one feature of a computer that is otherwise also used for other purposes.

A personal web server is conceptually the opposite of a web server, or website, operated by third parties, in a software as a service (SaaS) or cloud model.

Advantages
 Privacy: as the personal server is owned by the individual that derives the main benefit from it, they are in control of who else may access information on the server
 Autonomy: the owner of the personal server decides which applications to run on the server, whom to allow access to, when to upgrade, etc.
 Hackability: the owner of the personal server can configure and change any aspect of the personal server

Disadvantages
 Administration overhead: the owner of the server is responsible for system administration
 Higher power consumption: the power consumed per user is higher, on average, than in a model where many users use the same server, such as in the SaaS/cloud model.
 Poor scalability: the server may function poorly or crash if its resources are heavily accessed

See also
 Comparison of web server software
 Microsoft Personal Web Server

References 

Home servers
Web server software
Web 1.0